Madog II was a Prince of Powys Fadog from 1269 to 1277.

Lineage and inheritance 
He inherited the throne on the death of his father Prince Gruffydd Maelor II.

Alliance with Gwynedd 
He was in alliance with Llywelyn ap Gruffudd, the prince of Gwynedd and all Wales as his effective overlord during the period following the Treaty of Montgomery.

Death and burial 
In 1275, Llywelyn married the daughter of Simon de Montfort, 6th Earl of Leicester, the arch-enemy of the English king's father, Henry III. Simon's wife was Eleanor of England, the daughter of King John of the House of Plantagenet. 

When Llywelyn refused to offer a personal explanation, the king declared him a rebel and in 1277 invaded North Wales.

Although the king's primary target was Gwynedd, Powys Fadog stood in the way. Madog chose to support Llywelyn, and was consequently killed in the fighting. It is thought that Madog may have been buried at Valle Crucis Abbey, of which he was a patron.

Madog was succeeded by his younger brother Gruffydd. The conflict between Llywelyn and the King was settled by the Treaty of Aberconwy, which released Gruffydd and other Welsh princes from any allegiance to Llywelyn.

Sources 
'Littere Wallie'
'The History of Wales' Lloyd.

1277 deaths
Monarchs of Powys
Medieval Welsh killed in battle
13th-century Welsh monarchs
Year of birth unknown